Bentham is a civil parish in the Craven district of North Yorkshire, England, with a population of 3,027 at the 2011 Census.  The parish includes the town of High Bentham, occasionally known as Higher Bentham or just Bentham, and the older adjacent village of Low Bentham.

The town lies on the River Wenning, just west of the Yorkshire Dales National Park and on the northern edge of the Forest of Bowland. The original centre of the town lay in Low Bentham, but a market was granted to High Bentham in the 14th century, and it became a centre for weaving from the 18th century, particularly after weavers in the town discovered how to weave hosepipes from flax.

It was historically part of the West Riding of Yorkshire until 1974.

Governance 
An electoral ward of the same name exists. This ward includes Burton in Lonsdale and well as the Bentham (Town) ward and has a total population taken at the 2011 census of 3,606. The ward falls within the Skipton and Ripon parliamentary constituency.

The Bentham Town Council is responsible for local matters and the Town Hall, built in 1894. This facility includes several bookable spaces used by community groups and available for hire on a private basis, as well as housing the town's tourist information centre.

NHS Cumbria CCG is responsible for health matters for the population across the civil parish. Bentham Medical Practice is located centrally within the town.

Community

The town has hosted an agricultural show since the middle of the 19th century. The show, which take place annually on the first Saturday of September, is a traditional agricultural show with handicraft and horticulture as well as sheep, cattle and poultry competitions, but no horse classes. The 146th Bentham Agricultural Show  was held in 2018 at the Bentham Auction Mart.

In addition to the traditional agricultural show, the town also hosts an annual Carnival procession in June of each year. In addition to a themed street parade, the event usually culminates with a funfair and stalls hosted at the Bentham Auction Mart.

The town's Auction Mart was founded in 1903 and provides an important venue for community events as well as regular livestock sales. The site hosts bonfire night fireworks and Christmas market events in addition to the Agricultural Show and Carnival.

Bentham is served by Bentham Community Primary School, which caters for children aged three to eleven and, as of 2016 had just under 150 students on its roll.

The Bentham News is the monthly community publication for the town. Established in 1982 the publication currently circulates over 2,000 copies which are delivered free by volunteers to every household in Bentham. The publication is also available at central points in the town and outlying areas.

Walking: Heritage Trails 
Bentham has several circular heritage trails. There are three trails in total and these are colour coded, purple, pink and blue. This route is largely on footpaths and includes a number of stone styles along a circular route along the Wenning valley.
This route climbs up out of the town to the South and into the Forest of Bowland. The route included several ladder styles, and takes in the Great Stone of Fourstones known locally as Big Stone, where walkers can take in impressive views of the Yorkshire Three Peaks.

Public houses and eateries 
High Bentham has several pubs: the Black Bull, Hogs and Heifers, the Horse and Farrier and the Coach House (known previously as the Brown Cow).  The town's pubs and Working Men's Club play host to a number of events. Low Bentham has two pubs, the Sundial and the Punch Bowl.

There are also has a cafe/eaterie (The Black Pig), a Chinese takeaway (Little Fortune), a pizzeria/kebab house (Pizza 21) and 1 Indian takeaway, Bentham Baltie.

Railway 

The Leeds to Morecambe railway passes through the unmanned Bentham Station. The station was opened in 1850 and has about 18,000 users per year. When it first opened it was owned by the "Little" North Western Railway, it was later bought by the Midland Railway and is now operated by Northern. The station is supported Friends of Bentham Station (FOBS), a community group which has formally registered a stakeholder interest with Northern Rail.

Churches
There are two  churches in High Bentham:  St Boniface Roman Catholic Church and Bentham Methodist Chapel. St John the Baptist Church and Bentham Quakers Meeting House are in Low Bentham. Bentham has several youth groups for teenagers including the Bentham Youth Café (BYC) which is on Main Street and Monday's Youth Club which is organised by 4Youth. There are also separate youth drop-in sessions on Tuesday, Wednesday and Thursdays of each week which are also run by and held at the Youth Cafe. For younger children Springboard and Adventurers groups are held at the Methodist Church.  St Margaret's Church in High Bentham closed in 2013 due to lack of funding for basic maintenance. It has now been carefully renovated and converted into two private homes.

St John the Baptist Church

St John the Baptist Church is one of the oldest churches in the area, and was noted in the Domesday Book in 1086. During restoration work in the 19th century, a Saxon cross was discovered in the wall of the tower, and blackened stones in the tower wall are evidence that it was almost totally destroyed by fire after the Battle of Bannockburn in 1314. The church contains a display of Tudor glass, which is similar to some of the glass in York Minster. The present building was built in the 1870s by Richard Norman Shaw, and includes an ancient coffin slab dating from about 1340; the Kirkbeck Stone dating from the 17th century; a 15th-century bell hanging in the porch; and a reredos in Caen stone with marble panels. The church reputedly has the heaviest peal of six bells in Yorkshire, and together weigh . The old organ, which is no longer playable, was built by William Hill of London as a "house organ" for Walker Joy, a prosperous oil merchant in Leeds; his brother designed a hydraulic engine to pump the bellows, making it the first ever to be blown by mechanical power. The churchyard contains a memorial to Robert Poole, a gravedigger, consisting of a sculptured shovel leaning against a tree trunk. It is a grade II* listed building.

Golf Club
Bentham Golf Club is located on Robin Lane to the northern edge of the town. The Club has an 18-hole course which was established in the 1920s plus a driving range and 'footgolf' course. The course is set in the countryside to the south of the Three Peaks and is privately owned.

See also
 The Ridding — country house near Low Bentham

References

External links

Civil parishes in North Yorkshire
Craven District
Towns in North Yorkshire
Market towns in North Yorkshire